C. cornutus may refer to:

 Cerastes cornutus, a viper species
 Cotylurus cornutus, a helminth species
 Chaetoceros cornutus, a diatom species in the genus Chaetoceros
 Citharichthys cornutus, a flounder species in the genus Citharichthys
 Corydalus cornutus, a dobsonfly species in the genus Corydalus
 Craspedochiton cornutus, a chiton species in the genus Craspedochiton
 Culex cornutus, a mosquito species in the genus Culex

See also
 Cornutus (disambiguation)